The third season of Top Gear began airing on History from August 14, 2012, until April 2, 2013. Adam Ferrera, Tanner Foust, Rutledge Wood and The Stig returned as hosts, with sixteen weekly episodes being broadcast. This season was the first not to include segments, including car reviews, studio segments, Power laps and Big Star, Small Car, as they were discarded from the programme before season 3 commenced.

Production
On May 11, 2012, History renewed Top Gear for a third season. The season premiered on August 14, 2012, and ended on April 2, 2013. This season saw the discontinuation of car reviews, studio segments, Power laps and Big Star, Small Car; they were discarded in order to revamp the show with a whole new style of format, compared to the UK version.

Episodes

References

External links
 Season 3 at the Internet Movie Database

Top Gear seasons
2012 American television seasons
2013 American television seasons
2012 in American television
2013 in American television